Eugene L. Stowe (May 2, 1922 – April 6, 2020) was an American minister and emeritus general superintendent in the Church of the Nazarene.

He served as president of Nazarene Theological Seminary from 1966 to 1968, at which time he was elected as the 20th general superintendent of the Church of the Nazarene.

Stowe wrote The Ministry of Shepherding: A Study of Pastoral Practice which was published in 1976.

Stowe died on April 6, 2020.

References

1922 births
2020 deaths
American Nazarene ministers
Nazarene General Superintendents